Kallur is a small village in Palakkad district (erstwhile Palghat) of Kerala, southwest India, which is almost 20 km from Palakkad town and 17 km from Ottappalam.

Demographics of Kallur 
Malayalam is the Local Language here.

References

Villages in Palakkad district